José Herrera (born 9 March 2003), is a Bolivian professional footballer who plays as a defensive midfielder for Club Bolívar.

References

External links

2003 births
Living people
Bolivian footballers
Bolivia international footballers
Association football midfielders
Club Bolívar players
Bolivian Primera División players